Amelia Ishmael is an artist, curator, music journalist, scholar, and lecturer specializing in black metal, contemporary art, and art criticism. She received a Bachelor of Fine Arts in Photography and New Media from the Kansas City Art Institute and a Master of Arts in Modern Art History, Theory, and Criticism from the School of the Art Institute of Chicago. She has contributed to publications, including One+One Filmmakers Journal, Art in Print, Newcity, ArtSlant, Art Papers, Review, Art21, Cacophany, Becoming the Forest, and FNews Magazine. She is the co-editor of and a curator for the interdisciplinary journal Helvete: A Journal of Black Metal Theory, which specializes in black metal theory, and is the editor for the radio publication Radius. Her curated exhibitions include "Black Thorns in the Black Box" (with Bryan Wendorf) and "Black Thorns in the White Cube".

Ishmael first encountered metal music at the age of 14, when she was living in Florida. A friend from her art class introduced her to the band Six Feet Under, and shortly afterward another friend gave her a compilation of songs by Arcturus, Emperor, Cradle of Filth, Samael, and Pink Floyd. This piqued her interest in black metal, and when she relocated to Kansas City in the late 1990s she attended shows by the local black metal band Descension. During her undergraduate studies she created sound and multimedia art installations, basing many of them off of themes from the Odyssey. For her Master's thesis she wrote on black metal in contemporary art, work in which her installation "Black Thorns in the White Cube" was grounded. The piece explored how contemporary artists draw upon the languages, iconography, and narratives of black metal – what Ishmael calls the "mythology" of black metal. Reviewers, along with Ishmael herself, noted that some prior exposure to the black metal music scene was helpful for understanding the exhibition.

Selected publications

Exhibitions
"Black Thorns in the Black Box" (with Bryan Wendorf) - 2011
"Black Thorns in the White Cube" - 2012
"Prelude: The Breath of Charybdis" – 2013
.blacK~SSStaTic_darK~fuZZZ_dOOm~glitCH. – 2013
"The Night is No Longer Dead; it has a life of its own" – 2013
"Prelude: The Breath of Charybdis"
DIVINITUSSSANIMALUSSSACRÉUSSSORGANUSSS  (with support by Michelle Puetz and Peter Margasak) – 2014
"Eccentricities and Disorientations: Experiencing Geometricies in Black Metal" (with Elodie Lesourd) – 2015
"Bleeding Black Noise" – 2016
"I Am the Sun" – 2016
"Only The Truth Disguised in a Dream" – 2019

References

American art historians
American editors
Academics from Illinois
Writers from Chicago
American art curators
American women curators
Artists from Chicago
American art critics
American music journalists
American radio producers
Black metal
American contemporary artists
American feminist writers
American music theorists
Writers from Kansas City, Missouri
Artists from Kansas City, Missouri
21st-century American women artists
21st-century American women writers
Women art historians
American women musicologists
American women editors
American women critics
Year of birth missing (living people)
Living people
Historians from Illinois
Women radio producers